The Eparchy of Sokal – Zhovkva is an eparchy of the Ukrainian Greek Catholic Church, in the archeparchy (archdiocese) of Lviv in Ukraine. The incumbent eparch is Mykhaylo Koltun.

History
July 21, 2000: Established as Eparchy of Sokal from the Ukrainian Catholic Archeparchy of Lviv and the suppressed Ukrainian Catholic Eparchy of Zboriv.
September 20, 2006: Name Changed as Eparchy of Sokal-Zhovkva from Eparchy of Sokal.

Eparchial and auxiliary bishops
The following is a list of the bishops of Sokal-Zhovkva and their terms of service:
(since 21 Jul 2000 – ) Mykhaylo Koltun
 (since 12 Apr 2018 – ) Petro Loza, titular bishop of Panium, auxiliary

External links
Official homepage 
GCatholic.org information on the eparchy

Sokal